Rakitovec is a small settlement in the Municipality of Šentjur, eastern Slovenia. It lies on the shore of Lake Slivnica, east of Gorica pri Slivnici. The settlement, and the entire municipality, are included in the Savinja Statistical Region, which is in the Slovenian portion of the historical Duchy of Styria.

References

External links
Rakitovec at Geopedia

Populated places in the Municipality of Šentjur